DHA, Dha and dha may refer to:

Chemicals
 Docosahexaenoic acid, a 22:6 omega-3 fatty acid
 Dehydroandrosterone, an endogenous androgenic steroid
 Dehydroascorbic acid, an oxidized form of ascorbic acid 
 Dehydroacetic acid, a pyrone derivative used as a plasticiser, as a fungicide, as a bactericide, and as a food preservative
 Dihydroxyacetone, the active ingredient in sunless or self-tanning skincare products
 9,10-Dihydroanthracene, a form of anthracene whose center-ring carbons have been reduced
 Dihydroartemisinin, an antimalarial
 Dihydroalprenolol, a beta-adrenergic blocker
 Dehydroalanine, an uncommon unsaturated α-amino acid

Organizations
 Defence Housing Australia, a provider of family housing for members of the Australian Defence Forces
 Defence Housing Authority, provides commercial and residential housing developments for the Pakistani army
 Defence Housing Authority, Islamabad 
 Defence Housing Authority, Karachi
 Defense Health Agency, the United States Department of Defense agency responsible for managing the activities of the Military Health System
 Department of Humanitarian Affairs, now known as the United Nations Office for the Coordination of Humanitarian Affairs
 DHA Cinema, a movie theatre in Lahore, Pakistan
 Drug Houses of Australia, a Singapore pharmaceuticals manufacturer
 Demirören Haber Ajansı (Demirören News Agency), a Turkish news agency

Linguistics
 Dha (Indic), a glyph in the Brahmic family of script
 Dha (Javanese) (ꦝ), a letter in the Javanese script

Other
 Dha, Ladakh, a village in the Leh district of India.
Dhahran International Airport, military airbase in Dhahran, Saudi Arabia
 Dha (sword), a single-edged weapon found in Burma/Myanmar, Thailand and other parts of Southeast Asia
 Directory Harvest Attack, a method used by spammers to obtain email addresses
 Disarmament as Humanitarian Action, a research project carried out at the United Nations Institute for Disarmament Research
 Doctor of Health Administration, a doctoral degree
 D.Ha., an abbreviation used for the United States District Court for the District of Hawaii